Abzakovo (Abźaq) is a rural locality (a selo) and the administrative center of Abzakovsky Selsoviet, Beloretsky District of the Republic of Bashkortostan, Russia.

A ski resort of the same name is located in the vicinity.

References

External links
Official website of the Abzakovo ski resort

Rural localities in Beloretsky District